= 1897 in basketball =

The following are the basketball events of the year 1897 throughout the world.

- March 20 – Yale beat Penn in the first "modern" men's intercollegiate basketball game, between teams officially organized by their colleges and featuring five players per side. Previous intercollegiate games had occurred, but those games either featured teams of students that were not officially recognized by their schools, or that utilized the sport's original rules allowing nine players per side.
- November 15 – The U.S. Amateur Athletic Union (AAU) resolves to host the first official national basketball championship, to be held at the end of the 1897–1898 basketball season, as the "grand conclusion" to the season.
